Rue des Grands-Augustins is a street in Saint-Germain-des-Prés in the 6th arrondissement of Paris, France.

Access

Notable residents
Pablo Picasso, from 1937 to 1948

Grands-Augustins